Abadzhiev (masculine) or Abadzhieva (feminine) is a Bulgarian occupational surname, a producer of hodden. Notable people with the surname include:

Borislav Abadzhiev (born 1963), Bulgarian boxer
Ivan Abadzhiev (1932–2017), Bulgarian weightlifter
Stefan Abadzhiev (born 1934), Bulgarian footballer

Bulgarian-language surnames